Bruce Brothers Huntsville Regional Airport , also known as Huntsville Municipal Airport, is a city-owned, public-use airport located two nautical miles (4 km) northwest of the central business district of Huntsville, a city in Walker County, Texas, United States. It is included in the National Plan of Integrated Airport Systems for 2011–2015, which categorized it as a general aviation facility.

This airport is assigned a three-letter location identifier of UTS by the Federal Aviation Administration, but the International Air Transport Association (IATA) airport code is HTV (the IATA assigned UTS to Ust-Tsilma Airport in Russia).

History

In 2009 the Huntsville City Council had approved a name change of the airport from Huntsville Municipal Airport to Bruce Brothers Huntsville Regional Airport. On May 28, 2010, the airport was rededicated in honor of two World War II veterans, Harry Joe Bruce and Reeves "Jeep" Bruce, who died during the course of that war. The ribbon cutting was scheduled to be held on that day. However, as of December 2015, it is still listed as Huntsville Municipal Airport by the Federal Aviation Administration and the Texas Department of Transportation.

Facilities and aircraft 
The airport covers an area of 180 acres (73 ha) at an elevation of 363 feet (111 m) above mean sea level. It has one runway designated 18/36 with an asphalt surface measuring 5,005 by 100 feet (1,526 x 30 m).

For the 12-month period ending July 31, 2011, the airport had 21,400 aircraft operations, an average of 58 per day: 79% general aviation, 20% military, and 1% air taxi. At that time there were 64 aircraft based at this airport: 55 single-engine, 7 multi-engine, and 2 helicopters.

References

External links 

 Huntsville Airport Master Plan – City of Huntsville
 Aerial image as of January 1995 from USGS The National Map
 

Airports in Texas
Huntsville, Texas
Transportation in Walker County, Texas
Buildings and structures in Walker County, Texas